The Lady of the Barge is an anthology of short stories by W. W. Jacobs, first published in 1902. Many of Jacobs' most famous short stories, including "The Monkey's Paw", were published in this collection. These are stories of suspense, situational humour, romance, horror, crime, greed and murder.

Contents 
This volume includes twelve stories.

 "The Lady of the Barge"
 "The Monkey's Paw"
 "Bill's Paper Chase"
 "The Well"
 "Cupboard Love"
 "In the Library"
 "Captain Rogers"
 "A Tiger's Skin"
 "A Mixed Proposal"
 "An Adulteration Act"
 "A Golden Venture"
 "Three at Table"

Adaptations
The iconic classic horror tale "The Monkey's Paw" has been adapted for film, television and theatre, and has inspired musical works and literary retellings.

External links
 

1902 short story collections
British short story collections